is a 2004 Japanese film. The film revolves around the protagonist of the story, Japanese rock musician Miyavi, portraying himself and his adventures when he goes back 20 years in time.

Plot 
The film starts with Miyavi leaving to see family back in his hometown in Osaka.

After an initial run into a few fans, on the way, he falls asleep in his car, following which, he wakes up walking on a railway track. Experiencing a series of bizarre events with the locals, he soon realizes that he is in the year 1984. Upon realizing which, he goes to his house but as he's not sure how to face his family & their reaction to him "coming from the future," he runs away even after ringing the door bell.
Contemplating what to do now, he meets Shinni (Hassei Takano) in an alley, posting an advertisement about wanting to make a band. He convinces Shinni about his obvious good looks & being born to be a rock star. He also tells him that he could play the guitar & sing in the band. Convinced, Shinni asks for them to go to a recording studio. However, Miyavi advises against it. They leave for Shinni's home, whereupon witnessing Miyavi's remarkable guitar skills, Shinni accepts his proposal & agrees on letting him stay at his house.

Eventually, Miyavi meets a young boy (Matsushima Ryouta), who turns out to be his younger self.

Cast and crew

Cast

 Miyavi as himself
 Hassei Takano as Shinni
 Matsushima Ryouta as the younger Miyavi
 Hamasama Akane as Shinni's friend
 Kubata Shouta as Shinni's friend
 Ogushi Erika as Shinni's friend

Crew 
 Line producer - Kousuke Suzuki
 Planning - Keisuke Gotou, Hiroshi Fujimori
 Supervision - Hiroyuki Kondou
 Cameraman - Yuki Kimaya
 Editing - Hidaka Tokio
 Publicity - Ken Shouji
 Hair/make-up - Naomi Tooyama
 Clothing - Mikiko Mizuno
 Photography - S. Endou Mitsuhiro, Mikio Yuka
 Live lights - Shinichi Ueda
 Light Chief - Seiji Iwashita, Hirosuke Tongashi
 Audio - Hiroshi Miyada
 Choreography - Waku Hatayama
 Collaboration - Dynamite Tommy
 Film - Atom-X

DVD releases 

On February 25, 2004, Oresama was released on DVD in Japan by Free-Will with no subtitles and encoded for region 2 and retails at JPY¥4935 (approx. US$50.12).

On April 27, 2010, it was released on DVD in the United States by Discotek Media with English subtitles and encoded for region 1, at US$24.95 MSRP.

References

External links 
 

2000s Japanese-language films
Japanese rock music films
Discotek Media
Films set in Osaka
Films set in 1984
2000s Japanese films